Waikawa Beach is a small settlement in the Horowhenua District of the Manawatū-Whanganui region of New Zealand's North Island.  It is located on the South Taranaki Bight at the mouth of Waikawa Stream, 7.5 kilometres northwest of Manakau, and 19 kilometres southwest of Levin, both distances being by road.

Hank Edwards Reserve is a small park adjacent to a footpath over Waikawa Stream.

Erosion near the stream mouth has been a problem since the 1930s and particularly from February 2018.

Demographics

The population of Waikawa Beach was 132 in the 2018 New Zealand census, an increase of 30 (29.4%) since the 2013 census, and an increase of 18 (15.8%) since the 2006 census. There were 66 males and 63 females, giving a sex ratio of 1.05 males per female. Ethnicities were 117 people  (88.6%) European/Pākehā, 21 (15.9%) Māori, and 3 (2.3%) Pacific peoples (totals add to more than 100% since people could identify with multiple ethnicities). Of the total population, 12 people  (9.1%) were under 15 years old, 6 (4.5%) were 15–29, 78 (59.1%) were 30–64, and 36 (27.3%) were over 65.

Waikawa

Waikawa (Horowhenua District) had a population of 750 at the 2018 New Zealand census, an increase of 12 people (1.6%) since the 2013 census, and a decrease of 6 people (-0.8%) since the 2006 census. There were 321 households. There were 378 males and 369 females, giving a sex ratio of 1.02 males per female. The median age was 51.7 years (compared with 37.4 years nationally), with 90 people (12.0%) aged under 15 years, 114 (15.2%) aged 15 to 29, 390 (52.0%) aged 30 to 64, and 159 (21.2%) aged 65 or older.

Ethnicities were 84.8% European/Pākehā, 23.2% Māori, 3.2% Pacific peoples, 1.6% Asian, and 1.6% other ethnicities (totals add to more than 100% since people could identify with multiple ethnicities).

The proportion of people born overseas was 12.4%, compared with 27.1% nationally.

Although some people objected to giving their religion, 56.4% had no religion, 28.8% were Christian, 0.4% were Muslim, 0.8% were Buddhist and 4.0% had other religions.

Of those at least 15 years old, 93 (14.1%) people had a bachelor or higher degree, and 141 (21.4%) people had no formal qualifications. The median income was $29,700, compared with $31,800 nationally. The employment status of those at least 15 was that 294 (44.5%) people were employed full-time, 114 (17.3%) were part-time, and 36 (5.5%) were unemployed.

References

Populated places in Manawatū-Whanganui
Horowhenua District